Lee In (born 22 August 1952) is a South Korean former volleyball player who competed in the 1976 Summer Olympics.

References

1952 births
Living people
South Korean men's volleyball players
Olympic volleyball players of South Korea
Volleyball players at the 1976 Summer Olympics
Asian Games medalists in volleyball
Volleyball players at the 1974 Asian Games
Volleyball players at the 1978 Asian Games
Medalists at the 1974 Asian Games
Medalists at the 1978 Asian Games
Asian Games gold medalists for South Korea
Asian Games silver medalists for South Korea
20th-century South Korean people